Minonoa perbella is a moth in the family Dalceridae. It was described by William Schaus in 1905. It is found in southern Brazil. The habitat consists of subtropical wet and warm temperate moist forests.

References

Moths described in 1905
Dalceridae